Walsenburg is the Statutory City that is the county seat and the most populous municipality of Huerfano County, Colorado, United States. The city population was 3,049 at the 2020 census, down from 3,068 in 2010.

History
Walsenburg was originally settled under the name of La Plaza de los Leones in 1859. The settlement was named after settler Don Miguel Antonio de Leon, who came along with others from New Mexico.
A post office called Walsenburg has been in operation since 1870. The community was named after Fred Walsen, an early settler. Robert Ford, the assassin of outlaw Jesse James, operated a combination saloon and gambling house in Walsenburg; his home at 320 West 7th Street still stands.  The town is also remembered in sports history due to a famous newspaper gaffe ("Will Overhead") after the 1933 Indianapolis 500.

Colorado Coalfield War

Walsenburg played a central role in the 1913-1914 Strike of the United Mine Workers of America against the Rockefeller-owned Colorado Fuel and Iron, an event better known as the Colorado Coalfield War. The town was the site of a Colorado and Southern Railway stop and location of several gun-battles before and after the 20 April 1914 Ludlow Massacre that killed over a dozen women and children when Colorado National Guard opened fire on a striker encampment at Ludlow, 22 miles south of Walsenburg. Among the first instances of violence in Walsenburg during the coal strikes is known as the Seventh Street Massacre, which saw three miners died in a shooting perpetrated by newly minted Walsenburg deputies.

The Battle of Walsenburg (28-29 April 1914) was the penultimate engagement of National Guard and militia against pro-strikers during the 10-Day War stage of the conflict. Several men on both sides, as well as at least one uninvolved civilian, were killed before strikers withdrew.

Walsenburg is mentioned in the Woody Guthrie song "Ludlow Massacre".

21st Century
On 19 June 2013, Boy Scouts at Spanish Peaks Scout Ranch noticed an uncontrolled fire near East Spanish Peak which rapidly grew over the next few days, growing into the East Peak Fire. The entirety of Walsenburg was placed under a pre-evacuation notice. The fire burned   and was contained on July 9th.

Geography and climate
Walsenburg is located in east-central Huerfano County, on the north side of the Cucharas River, at the eastern edge of the foothills of the Sangre de Cristo Mountains. Interstate 25 runs along the eastern edge of the city, with access from Exits 49, 50, and 52. I-25 leads north  to Pueblo and south  to Trinidad. U.S. Route 160 passes through the center of Walsenburg, leading west across North La Veta Pass  to Alamosa and south with I-25 to Trinidad. Colorado State Highway 10 leads northeast from Walsenburg  to La Junta.

The building houses a state-operated veterans' retirement home and a community hospital that serves the area.

Walsenburg has a humid subtropical climate (Cfa) with hot, rainy summers with cool nights and cool snowy winters with chilly nights.

Local attractions and recreation
Martin Lake and Horseshoe Lake offer fishing stocked by the Colorado Division of Wildlife, water skiing, boating, and jet skiing. Hiking and camping are other activities in the park, and it is the only state park in Colorado with a golf course.

The Highway of Legends, connecting Walsenburg with La Veta, other historic mining towns, and Trinidad, is a National Scenic Byway.

The Walsenburg Golf Course is a 9-hole public golf course open for play year round. The city opened a $2 million water park, "Walsenburg Wild Waters", after efforts by former mayor Maurice Brau and the City Council, on May 27, 2007.

Demographics

As of the census of 2000, there were 4,182 people, 1,497 households, and 881 families residing in the city. The racial makeup of the city was 74.99% White, 4.78% African American, 3.35% Native American, 0.41% Asian, 0.07% Pacific Islander, 12.46% from other races, and 3.95% from two or more races. Hispanic or Latino of any race were 50.96% of the population.

There were 1,497 households, out of which 25.9% had children under the age of 18 living with them, 41.1% were married couples living together, 13.8% had a female householder with no husband present, and 41.1% were non-families. 37.3% of all households were made up of individuals, and 19.4% had someone living alone who was 65 years of age or older. The average household size was 2.25 and the average family size was 2.95.

In the city, the population was spread out, with 20.9% under the age of 18, 9.3% from 18 to 24, 31.1% from 25 to 44, 21.2% from 45 to 64, and 17.5% who were 65 years of age or older. The median age was 38 years. For every 100 females, there were 133.1 males. For every 100 females age 18 and over, there were 141.1 males.

Education  
John Mall High School is the local high school. It is the only high school in Huerfano District Re-1. In the 2021–2022 school year, there was a total enrollment of 137 students. 56% of the enrollment was male and 44% was female. There was a student-to-teacher ratio of 27:1, which is higher than the Colorado state average of 15:1. 66% of the student body identified as a minority, with most of them being Hispanic. The state average of minority enrollment is 48%. The graduation rate ranges from 70-79%, which is lower than the state average of 80%.

Notable people
Notable individuals who were born in or have lived in Walsenburg include:
 Xavier Atencio (1919–2017), animator
 Robert Ford (1861–1892), murderer, saloon owner
 Debora Greger (born 1949), poet
 Matthew G. Martínez (1929–2011), U.S. Representative from California
 Frank Olmstead, mayor of Las Vegas, New Mexico and 18th Auditor of New Mexico
John R. Petrus (1923–2013), Wisconsin state legislator
Roy Porter (1923–1998), jazz drummer

See also

Outline of Colorado
Index of Colorado-related articles
State of Colorado
Colorado cities and towns
Colorado municipalities
Colorado counties
Huerfano County, Colorado

References

External links

City of Walsenburg official website
CDOT map of the City of Walsenburg

Populated places established in 1873
Hispanic and Latino American culture in Colorado
Cities in Huerfano County, Colorado
Cities in Colorado
County seats in Colorado
1873 establishments in Colorado Territory